2015 Academy Awards may refer to:

 87th Academy Awards, the Academy Awards ceremony which took place in 2015
 88th Academy Awards, the Academy Awards ceremony which took place in 2016 honoring the best in film for 2015